Karuppan is a 2017 Indian Tamil-language action drama film written and directed by R. Panneerselvam, starring Vijay Sethupathi, Tanya Ravichandran and Bobby Simha. The film began production during January 2017 and released on 29 September 2017 to mixed reviews and become an average success.

Cast
Vijay Sethupathi as Karuppan
Tanya Ravichandran as Anbuselvi Karuppan
Bobby Simha as Kathir
Pasupathy as Maayi (Anbuselvi's brother) 
Kaveri as Muthu (Maayi's wife)
Singampuli as Karuppan's uncle
Renuka as Karuppan's mother
Sharath Lohitashwa as Varasanattu Perusu
Linga

Production
After the production of Naan Thaan Siva was postponed as a result of Thirrupathi Brothers' financial problems, R. Panneerselvam announced in September 2016 that he would collaborate with Vijay Sethupathi for a film. Produced by A. M. Rathnam, the team approached Keerthy Suresh to play the lead role later that month, but the actress did not sign the project owing to schedule clashes. Ritika Singh was initially signed on to play the lead role, but was later replaced by Lakshmi Menon before production had begun. Lakshmi Menon later pulled out of the film citing an injury and was replaced by Tanya Ravichandran. Bobby Simha agreed to play the antagonist in the film, despite earlier opting to star only in leading roles.

Following a launch event held in December 2016, the team began filming sequences in Theni during January 2017. The motion poster of this film is planned to release on 13 July 2017. Its reported that, due to indefinite strike announced by Film Employees Federation of South India, Karuppan team is waiting to film few portions of the movie. The satellite rights of the film were bagged by Sun TV (India),.

Plot 
The movie begins with Karuppan (played by Vijay Sethupathi) entering the village of his ancestors. He is a skilled fighter who earns his living by participating in local wrestling competitions. He meets Anbu (played by Tanya Ravichandran), a school teacher, and falls in love with her. Anbu too develops feelings for Karuppan and reciprocates his love.

However, their happiness is short-lived when Maayi (played by Pasupathy), a powerful man in the village, opposes their relationship. Maayi is a wealthy landlord and has a hold over the entire village. He believes that Karuppan is not fit to be with Anbu and tries to break their relationship.

Karuppan, with his strength and courage, fights against Maayi and his men. He also uncovers a few secrets about Maayi's past, which adds to the tension between the two. Bobby Simha plays the role of Baasha, a close aide of Maayi who also has his own personal vendetta against Karuppan.

The situation turns worse when Maayi's daughter falls in love with Karuppan's younger brother. This leads to more conflicts between the two families. Karuppan tries to find a peaceful solution to the problem, but Maayi is not willing to listen.

Finally, in the climax, Karuppan confronts Maayi and his men in a fierce battle. With his fighting skills and intelligence, Karuppan overcomes all the obstacles and defeats Maayi's men. The fight ends with Maayi and Karuppan facing each other. In a tense and thrilling sequence, Karuppan emerges victorious, and Maayi dies.

The movie ends with Karuppan marrying Anbu and living a happy life with his family. The movie was appreciated for its action sequences and the chemistry between Vijay Sethupathi and Tanya Ravichandran. It was also praised for its portrayal of the bond between brothers and the importance of family values.

Controversy 
Kaathan, the owner of the bull, which is used in the first look poster has reported that, the producers of this movie has not got his permission to use Komban's picture (bull's name is Komban). He has also said that, his Komban has not been tamed by anyone so far and the bull has huge fan following for that reason. Now Kaathan is demanding an unconditional apology from the director, producer and the protagonist. The problem was solved after Vijay Sethupathi met Kaathan.

Release
Baradwaj Rangan of Film Companion wrote "Karuppan is an unabashed shrine to Vijay Sethupathi, who does fascinating things that seem halfway between deliberate acting choices and showing up on the set and doing the first thing that came to mind."

Soundtrack
The soundtrack is composed by D. Imman. The soundtrack consists of 5 songs and 3 karaoke tracks.

References

External links
 

2017 films
2010s Tamil-language films
Films scored by D. Imman